| lowest attendance   = 247Ampthill v Ealing Trailfinders7 December 2019
| tries               = {{#expr: 

 9 + 13 + 9 + 3 + 13 + 6
 + 4 + 8 + 5 + 9 + 7 + 6
 + 6 + 6 + 8 + 10 + 9 + 6
 + 14 + 15 + 9 + 7 + 10 + 6
 + 6 + 7 + 8 + 7 + 9 + 7
 + 4 + 11 + 8 + 7 + 6 + 8
 + 2 + 8 + 5 + 8

 
}}
| top point scorer    =  Craig Willis(Ealing Trailfinders)57 points 
| top try scorer      =  Alex O'Meara(Cornish Pirates)8 tries
| venue               = 
| attendance2         = 
| champions           = 
| count               = 
| runner-up           = 
| website             = 
| previous year       = 2018–19
| next year           = 2021–22
}}

The 2019–20 RFU Championship Cup was the second season of the annual rugby union Championship Cup competition for second tier, professional English clubs playing in the RFU Championship.

The competition ended without a winner after the quarter-final stage due to the premature end of the RFU Championship season due to the 2019–20 coronavirus pandemic in the United Kingdom.

Competition format
The competition format is a pool stage followed by a knockout stage. The pool stage consists of three pool of four teams each playing home and away matches.  Pool matches ran from September through to December, on weekends when there is no RFU Championship league fixtures.  In the inaugural season, the RFU had set out the pools in a regional format to encourage derby games, but this year's competition format was more loosely structured.

The top two sides in each pool, plus the two best third placed teams, progressed to the knockout stage, with the best ranked sides getting home advantage in the quarter-finals. The semi-finals and final were cancelled.

Participating teams and locations

Pool stage

Pool 1

Round 1

Round 2

Round 3

Round 4

Round 5

Round 6

Pool 2

Round 1

Round 2

Round 3

Round 4

Round 5

Round 6

Pool 3

Round 1

Round 2

Round 3

Round 4

Round 5

Round 6

Knock-out stage
The eight qualifiers are seeded according to performance in the pool stage - with the 3 pool winners making the top 3 seeds along with the best runner up as seed number 4, and the next two runners up and two best 3rd place teams making up the other 4 seeds. The top 4 seeds host the quarter-finals against the lower seeds, in a 1 v 8, 2 v 7, 3 v 6, 4 v 5 format. However, if two teams qualify from the same pool they can not be drawn together.

Teams are ranked by:
1 – competition points (4 for a win, 2 for a draw)
2 – where competition points are equal, greatest number of wins
3 – where the number of wins are equal, greatest number of tries scored
4 – where the number of tries are equal, greatest number of points scored
4 – where the number of points scored are equal, aggregate points difference
6 – where the aggregate points differences are equal, least red cards
7 – if red cards are equal, then ranking will be decided by the toss of a coin

Quarter-finals

Attendances

Individual statistics
 Points scorers includes tries as well as conversions, penalties and drop goals. Appearance figures also include coming on as substitutes (unused substitutes not included).

Top points scorers

Top try scorers

Season records

Team
Largest home win — 83 points
83 – 0 Nottingham at home to Yorkshire Carnegie on 20 September 2019
Largest away win — 50 points
50 – 0 Nottingham away to Yorkshire Carnegie on 14 December 2019
Most points scored — 83 points
83 – 0 Nottingham at home to Yorkshire Carnegie on 20 September 2019
Most tries in a match — 13
Nottingham at home to Yorkshire Carnegie on 20 September 2019
Most conversions in a match — 10
Ealing Trailfinders at home to Bedford Blues on 30 November 2019
Most penalties in a match — 5
Hartpury at home to Doncaster Knights on 14 December 2019
Most drop goals in a match — 0

Player
Most points in a match — 25
 Craig Willis for Ealing Trailfinders at home to Bedford Blues on 30 November 2019
Most tries in a match — 4
 Alex O'Meara for Cornish Pirates away to Nottingham on 4 October 2019
Most conversions in a match — 10
 Craig Willis for Ealing Trailfinders at home to Bedford Blues on 30 November 2019
Most penalties in a match — 5
 Josh Bragman for Hartpury at home to Doncaster Knights on 14 December 2019
Most drop goals in a match — 0

Attendances
Highest — 3,818
Newcastle Falcons at home to Hartpury on 29 November 2019
Lowest — 247
Ampthill at home to Ealing Trailfinders on 7 December 2019
Highest average attendance — 3,242	
Newcastle Falcons
Lowest average attendance — 383	
Yorkshire Carnegie

Notes

See also
 RFU Championship
 British and Irish Cup
 2019–20 Premiership Rugby Cup
 English rugby union system
 List of English rugby union teams
 Rugby union in England

References

External links
 RFU

Rugby union competitions in England
RFU Championship Cup
2019–20 rugby union tournaments for clubs
2019–20 RFU Championship